Ear of the Dragon (1995) is a CD album released on the Fortune 5 label in collaboration with A Magazine. It is a compilation of tracks by American and Canadian indie bands which contained Asian-American members. The album contains a broad range of American indie music styles and notable indie artists from the early to mid 1990s including indie rock (Versus and The Dambuilders), punk (J Church and aMiniature), ska punk (Skankin' Pickle), slowcore (Seam), cuddlecore (cub), and key players in post-rock (David Pajo was a member of Slint and both he and Bundy K. Brown (aka Slowpoke) were members of seminal post-rock band Tortoise).

Track listing 
The track running order listed on the CD cover is incorrect-the list below shows the actual running order of the CD.
 Signer's Strut - aMiniature
 Losing My Cool - Yanti Arifin
 Reveille - Versus
 Tossing Pearls - Venus Cures All
 Hey Latasha - Seam
 Day into Night - Dolomite
 Live for Yourself - Kicking Giant
 Your King - Team Xiaoping
 Secret Nothing - cub
 The Naked City - Cartographers
 Smooth Control - The Dambuilders
 Perfect World - Mint Aundry
 Heavens to Betsy - Chumley
 I Would for You - J Church
 Pabu Boy - Skankin' Pickle
 Mr. Onion #2 - Slowpoke
 It's About Time - Azure
 She - Squash Blossom
 Undiu - David Pajo Band

Tour 
Some of the bands represented on this compilation (including Seam, aMiniature, Venus Cures All, Cub and Versus) toured together in support of the "Ear of the Dragon" compilation in 1995. This tour included major US and Canadian cities including Toronto, Los Angeles, New York City and Chicago. According to Billboard Magazine, the tour began April 28, 1995 in Toronto and ended May 27, 1995 in Chicago.

References

External links
NY Times - Asian-Americans Stake a Claim on Rock
Ear of the Dragon at USAsians.net

1995 compilation albums
Asian-American culture
Indie rock compilation albums